Victor Cieslinskas Zinevicaite (October 27, 1922 – June 19, 2007) was a Uruguayan basketball player of Lithuanian descent. He competed in the 1948 Summer Olympics and in the 1952 Summer Olympics.

Cieslinskas was part of the Uruguayan basketball team, which finished fifth in the 1948 tournament.

Four years later Cieslinskas was a member of the Uruguayan team, which won the bronze medal. He played all eight matches.

He died in 2007, and is buried at Cementerio del Norte, Montevideo.

References

External links

1922 births
2007 deaths
Uruguayan men's basketball players
Olympic basketball players of Uruguay
Basketball players at the 1948 Summer Olympics
Basketball players at the 1952 Summer Olympics
Olympic bronze medalists for Uruguay
Uruguayan people of Lithuanian descent
Olympic medalists in basketball
Burials at the Cementerio del Norte, Montevideo
Medalists at the 1952 Summer Olympics